The Minister of Industries and Commerce in New Zealand is a former cabinet position (existing from 1894 to 1972) appointed by the Prime Minister to be in charge of matters of industrial and commercial growth and trade. In 1972 it was replaced with the new office of Minister of Trade and Industry.

List of ministers
The following ministers have held the office of Minister of Industries and Commerce.

Key

Notes

References

Industries and Commerce
Political office-holders in New Zealand